Miami Tornado may refer to:
The 1925 Miami tornado, the deadliest ever to strike Miami-Dade County, Florida
The 1997 Miami Tornado, an F1 tornado which touched down in Miami, Florida
The Miami tornadoes of 2003